The Big 4-0 is a TV Land original program that began airing April 14, 2008. The series highlights the celebrations of six people who turn 40. Documentary-style interviews are conducted with each of the celebrants. The series was filmed in various locations throughout the United States.

Episodes
Episode 1: The first episode features Derrick

Celebrants
 Derrick
 Lisa
 Brian
 Tonya
 Rita
 DeeAnn

External links
 Official Big 4-0 Website on TVLand.com

2000s American reality television series
2008 American television series debuts